The Ivy League Fencing Championships (officially, the Ivy League Fencing Round-Robins) is an annual tournament to determine the Ivy League standings in men's and women's fencing. Unlike at the NCAA Fencing Championships, the men's and women's events are contested separately.

History
Then men's Ivy League Round-Robin has existed since 1956; the women's since 1982. Currently, five teams compete in the men's tournament, as Brown, Cornell and Dartmouth do not sponsor NCAA men's fencing teams. Brown and Cornell had previously participated, but their men's NCAA team were cut after the 2020 and 1993 seasons, respectively. The women's competition features seven teams, with every Ivy League school with the exception of Dartmouth sponsoring a team.

Men's Results

Women's Results

1.After the 1983 season, Columbia began accepting women. All future results are noted as Columbia, though students from Barnard were able to compete on the Columbia team. This is the only Division I NCAA consortium team.

References

Championship
College fencing conference championships in the United States